The 1944 Turkish Football Championship was the 10th edition of the competition. It was held in May. Fenerbahçe won their sixth national championship title by winning the Final Group in Ankara undefeated.

The champions of the three major regional leagues (Istanbul, Ankara, and İzmir) qualified directly for the Final Group. Mersin İdman Yurdu qualified by winning the qualification play-off, which was contested by the winners of the regional qualification groups.

Final group

See also
 1944 Turkish National Division
 1944 Prime Minister's Cup

References

External links
RSSSF

Turkish Football Championship seasons
Turkish
Turkey